The following is a list of FCC-licensed radio stations in the U.S. state of Montana, which can be sorted by their call signs, frequencies, cities of license, licensees, and programming formats.

List of radio stations

Defunct
KBCK

References

 
Radio stations
Montana